"Flame" is a song by Sebadoh from their 1999 album The Sebadoh. It was released as a CD single and 7" vinyl record.

The song peaked at number 30 on the UK Singles chart. It is their highest-charting single.

Track listing
UK 7" Single (RUG80)
"Flame (remix)"
"Flame (4-track)"
 "Sweet Surrender" (John Denver cover)

References

Sebadoh songs
1999 singles
Warner Records singles
1999 songs
Songs written by Lou Barlow